The 1995–96 Esiliiga is the fifth season of the Esiliiga, second-highest Estonian league for association football clubs, since its establishment in 1992. The season was won by FC Norma Tallinn.

Main tournament
Four best teams qualify to the Premier Division promotion play-off, other four to First Division promotion play-off.

Table

Premier Division promotion play-off
JK Vall Tallinn promoted to Premier Division, Pärnu JK relegated to First Division.

Table

First Division promotion play-off
JK Kalev Sillamäe and Olümp Maardu promoted to First Division, FC Arsenal Tallinn and DAG Tartu relegated to Second Division.

Table

See also
1995–96 Meistriliiga
1995 in Estonian football
1996 in Estonian football

References

Esiliiga seasons
2
2
Estonia